Kraft Dinner (KD) in Canada, Kraft Mac & Cheese in the United States, Australia, and New Zealand, Cheesey Pasta in the United Kingdom and internationally is a nonperishable, packaged macaroni and cheese product. It is made by Kraft Foods Group (or parent company Mondelez internationally) and traditionally cardboard-boxed with dried macaroni pasta and a packet of orange processed cheese powder. It was introduced under the Kraft Dinner name simultaneously in both Canada and the U.S. in 1937. The brand is popular with Canadians, who consume 55% more boxes per capita than Americans.

There are now many similar products, including private label, of nonperishable boxed macaroni and cheese. Commercially, the line has evolved, with deluxe varieties marketed with liquid processed cheese, as well as microwavable frozen mac-and-cheese meals. The product by Kraft has developed into many flavour variations and formulations, including Easy Mac (a product that has since been renamed Mac & Cheese Dinner Cups), a single-serving product designed specifically for microwave ovens.

The product's innovation, at the time of the Great Depression, was to conveniently market nonperishable dried macaroni noodles together with a processed cheese powder. The product is prepared by cooking the pasta and adding the cheese powder along with butter (or margarine) and milk.

History
The prerequisite to a shelf-stable packaged macaroni and cheese product was the invention of processed cheese, where emulsifying salts help stabilize the product, giving it a longer life. Although James Lewis Kraft, of Fort Erie, Ontario, but living in Chicago, did not invent processed cheese, he won a patent for one processing method in 1916 and began to build his cheese business.

During the Great Depression, a St. Louis, Missouri, salesman, Grant Leslie of Dundee, Scotland, had the idea to sell macaroni pasta and cheese together as a package, so he began attaching grated cheese to boxes of pasta with a rubber band. In 1937, Kraft introduced the product in the U.S. and Canada. The timing of the product's launch had much to do with its success: during World War II, the rationing of milk and dairy products, an increased reliance on meatless meals, and more women working outside the home, created a large market for the product, which was considered a hearty meal for families. Its shelf life of ten months was attractive at a time when many Canadian homes did not have refrigerators. Also, consumers could receive, for one food ration stamp, two boxes. The original box was primarily yellow. 50 million boxes were sold during the war. The box's primary colour changed to blue in 1954, later used in an advertising campaign where children were encouraged to ask for "The Blue Box".

A version with spiral-shaped noodles debuted in 1975, while Velveeta Shells & Cheese were introduced in 1984. A single-serving variation requiring only water for preparation was introduced as Easy Mac in 1999. In 2006, the cheddar and white cheddar versions switched to organic macaroni, while Easy Mac Cups were introduced the same year. In 2007, the noodles switched to 50 percent whole grain.

Macaroni & Cheese Crackers also debuted in 2007. The crackers were discontinued in 2008, as they did not meet company targets. A sub-line, Homestyle Deluxe, was added in 2010 in three flavours: cheddar, four-cheese sauce, and Old World Italian.

Kraft Macaroni and Cheese sold in the United States used to include Yellow 5 and Yellow 6 to make the food a brighter colour. In Europe, food that contains Yellow 5 requires a warning label saying, "This product may have adverse effect on activity and attention in children." In 2014, none of the European varieties were made with artificial dyes.

On November 1, 2013,  Kraft announced that there would be 457 new pasta shape varieties for children in the U.S. would no longer include Yellow 5 and Yellow 6, and there would be a decrease in the sodium and saturated fat content, and six more grams of whole grains.

In April 2015, it was announced that those changes, including the elimination of artificial preservatives, would be extended throughout the line after January 2016. Paprika, annatto and turmeric are used for colouring. According to Kraft, the changes were a response to consumer feedback.

In 2018, Kraft-Heinz introduced the KD Shaker, which was a plastic bottle of Kraft Mac and Cheese Dinner's powdered cheese, allowing one to use the cheese powder as they wish, without needing to worry about unused pasta. The product is similar to shelf-stable Parmesan cheese powder bottle cans.

In Canadian culture

Kraft Dinner has been called a de facto national dish of Canada. Packaged in Quebec with Canadian wheat and milk, and other ingredients from Canada and the US, Canadians purchase 1.7 million of the 7 million boxes sold globally each week and eat an average of 3.2 boxes of Kraft Dinner each year, 55% more than Americans. The meal is the most popular grocery item in the country, where "Kraft Dinner" has an iconic status and has become a generic trademark of sorts for macaroni and cheese. It is often simply referred to by the initials K.D. As Kraft Dinner has a different name in Canada from the United States and other markets, the Canadian marketing and advertising platform is a made-in-Canada effort that cannot be easily adapted to the US market.

Pundit Rex Murphy wrote that "Kraft Dinner revolves in that all-but-unobtainable orbit of the Tim Hortons doughnut and the A&W Teen Burger. It is one of that great trinity of quick digestibles that have been enrolled as genuine Canadian cultural icons." Douglas Coupland wrote that "cheese plays a weirdly large dietary role in the lives of Canadians, who have a more intimate and intense relationship with Kraft food products than the citizens of any other country. This is not a shameless product plug – for some reason, Canadians and Kraft products have bonded the way Australians have bonded with Marmite [sic, recte:Vegemite], or the English with Heinz baked beans. In particular, Kraft Macaroni and Cheese, known simply as Kraft Dinner, is the biggie, probably because it so precisely laser-targets the favoured Canadian food groups: fat, sugar, starch and salt." Immigrants often mention Kraft Dinner when surveys ask for examples of Canadian food. As a measure of the product's Canadian popularity, its Facebook page, KD Battle Zone, attracted 270,000 fans, despite there being no prizes for the contest.

Canadian rock band Barenaked Ladies refer to the product in their popular song "If I Had $1000000", indicating that they would continue to eat the inexpensive foodstuff even if they were millionaires. This has often prompted fans at live concerts to throw boxes of Kraft Dinner onto the stage when the line is sung; the band has discouraged this and have urged fans to donate the boxes to their local food bank instead.

Former Prime Minister Paul Martin regularly referred to it as his favourite food, though he also confessed that he was unable to prepare it. During the same election former Prime Minister Stephen Harper stated that "I'll never be able to give my kids a billion-dollar company, but Laureen and I are saving for their education. And I have actually cooked them Kraft Dinner—I like to add wieners." Most Canadians ignore the instructions and believe that they have a unique way of preparing the food, like adding wieners or cheese. Additional ingredients are not always necessary; simply adjusting the cooking time and the amount of milk or butter/margarine can produce a dish ranging from soft noodles in a creamy sauce to firm noodles in a thin, milky sauce.

In the September 2012 issue of The Walrus magazine, the story "Kraft Dinner is Canada's True National Dish" by Sasha Chapman details the history of the Canadian cheese industry and Kraft's impact on it. She notably draws attention to Canada being unique in favouring a manufactured food product (made by a foreign company) as its national dish at the expense of local cheeses. Chapman's article is structured around this question, from the first page:But what does it mean if a national dish is manufactured, formulated by scientists in a laboratory in Glenview, Illinois, and sold back to us by the second-largest food company in the world?Kraft Dinner is a frequent staple of Canadian university student diets. Consequently, university students protesting government funding cuts and tuition hikes have often used Kraft Dinner as a prop to draw attention to their plight.

Nutrition

Prepared Kraft Dinner is 71% carbohydrates, 11% protein, and 5% fat (table). In a 100 gram (3.5 oz) reference serving, Kraft Dinner supplies 382 calories and rich contents (20% or more of the Daily Value, DV) of sodium (56% DV) and iron (25% DV), with calcium in moderate content (15% DV) (table).

Preparation 
The box describes a simple three step process (the "cooking instructions") for preparing the dinner. The 1-2-3 directions include "Boil", "Drain", and "Add". "Boiling" is further defined as boiling water and adding the pasta, with no reference to added salt or covering of the pan. The directions indicate the pasta cooking time, usually as a range. The "Drain" step shows a colander being used. The last step, "Add", says to add all the ingredients back to the pot (with no reference to whether to leave the pot on the stove or turn off the burner) and mix thoroughly.

Although many people have their own personal preferences for quantities of added ingredients, the box has a "classic prep" list that says to use 6 cups water, 1 Tbsp. margarine, and 1/3 cup skim milk. People may also vary the "cooking instructions" to their personal preferences, which may include adding salt to the water or omitting ingredients like milk.

Variations
New product lines using different flavours and pasta shapes have been introduced over the decades and the shelf life has at various times been increased.  Kraft Dinner is seen as an inexpensive, easy-to-make comfort food, with marketing that highlights its value and convenience.

The product is now available in a variety of compositions:

 The Original Recipe of dry macaroni pasta (roughly 172 grams) and 70 ml (roughly 42 grams) of powdered processed cheese. This category includes additional flavours of powdered cheese sauce (see Flavours and shapes).
 The Deluxe form, with the powdered processed cheese replaced with a prepared processed cheese sauce that comes in a foil pouch (cheese sauce formerly came in a can). This allows the cheese to be applied directly to the cooked pasta without additional preparation or ingredients. The pasta is also different; elbow macaroni replaces the thin, straight macaroni supplied as part of the "Original Recipe."
 The Homestyle form is the newest form of Kraft Mac & Cheese. It is similar to the "Deluxe" form, though it provides a large size, and includes seasoned breadcrumbs to apply to the macaroni and cheese. It comes in three flavours: cheddar cheese, four-cheese, and Old World Italian. It is marketed as being a "more premium option", for those who would not eat the "Original Recipe". This version also has the prepared process cheese sauce that comes in a foil pouch. Due to the breadcrumb topping, this form has more sodium than the "Deluxe" or "Original Recipe" forms. As of 2015, this variant has now been discontinued due to lack of demand.
 Dinner Cups, formerly Kraft Easy Mac, which makes single-serving portions. This formulation is prepared in a microwave oven and is popular among college students.
 A commercial version is manufactured for restaurant distribution that is a frozen, fully prepared product which is designed to be heated in a microwave. The product can be found at Burger King and Applebee's restaurants.
 In summer of 2021, Kraft Heinz released a selection of stir-in flavour boosters in the Canadian market. In total, there are 6 different Kraft Dinner Flavour Boosts in the following flavours: Jalapeño, Butter Chicken, Poutine, Buffalo Wings, Ghost Pepper, and Cotton Candy. These packets are added to a prepared pot of Kraft Dinner and are designed to enhance the experience by providing a new flavour variation for the eater.

Kraft Dinner Smart
Kraft Dinner Smart (also known as KD Smart) launched as a healthy sub-brand of the Kraft Dinner brand. It represents a line of Kraft macaroni and cheese products that contain no artificial flavours, colours, or preservatives, and have added ingredients like cauliflower, oats, or flax seed blended into the noodles. It comes in four varieties:

Kraft Dinner Smart launched in Canada in March 2010 with two vegetable varieties. In June 2011, the line-up was re-launched with new packaging graphics and two new varieties (Flax Omega-3 and High Fibre).

The product is made with real Kraft cheddar and is manufactured in Mount Royal, Quebec.

Flavours and shapes 
The shapes come in the original tenderoni, various pop culture icons, alphabet, numbers, and spirals. Organic and whole-grain versions are offered. A larger box called "family size" is offered.

 Original recipe
 Thick N' Creamy
 Three cheese
 Cheddar explosion

Marketing
The product was marketed as Kraft Dinner with the slogan "a meal for four in nine minutes for an everyday price of 19 cents." It was re-branded to Kraft Macaroni & Cheese in the United States and other countries, although the word "Dinner" still appears in small type on the U.S. version. In several markets it goes by different names; in the United Kingdom it is also marketed as Cheesey Pasta.

The product is heavily promoted toward children in the United States on television. When advertising to younger children, the television advertisement encourages the children to ask for "The Blue Box." In 2010 Kraft launched a $50 million multi-media marketing campaign with a nostalgia theme aimed at adults to promote all varieties of Kraft dinner. In Canada, Kraft has advertising programs intended to make the meal appealing to newly arrived immigrant groups.

There are regular promotional tie-in versions of the Kraft Dinner, aimed at kids. Packages have come with pasta in the shapes of various characters popular with children, such as Looney Tunes, Super Mario Bros., and Star Wars. Kraft Foods has also released many products under the product banner. These include other versions of macaroni and cheese with different shaped pasta and different flavours, but it has also included completely different dishes, such as spaghetti, in several different flavours.

In promotion of the introduction of its "Cheddar Explosion" variety of Kraft Dinner, Kraft sponsored the demolition of Texas Stadium April 11, 2010. In its last act of 2009 the Irving, Texas city council made Kraft Macaroni and Cheese the official sponsor of the demolition. Kraft paid $75,000 to local charities and donated another $75,000 in Kraft products. A national essay contest directed at children who "have made a difference in their community" was held with the winner allowed to push the button initiating the controlled demolition. The winning essayist was 11-year-old Casey Rogers of Terrell, Texas, founder of a charity serving the homeless.

Gallery

See also
 Cheez Whiz
 Hamburger Helper
 Velveeta Shells & Cheese

References

External links

 
 Guide to Macaroni and Cheese  Spread of ratings for all 130 products in Macaroni and Cheese evaluated by GoodGuide.
 "Labels and Other “Krafty” Stuff"

Canadian cuisine
Kraft Foods brands
Products introduced in 1937
Dinner
American pasta dishes
Food powders